The 2009 Sunset Moulding YCRC Challenger was a professional tennis tournament played on hard courts. It was part of the 2009 ATP Challenger Tour. It took place in Yuba City, California, United States between 1 and 7 June 2009.

Singles entrants

Seeds

 Rankings are as of May 25, 2009.

Other entrants
The following players received wildcards into the singles main draw:
  Nicholas John Andrews
  Ryan Harrison
  Cecil Mamiit
  Jesse Witten

The following players received entry from the qualifying draw:
  Adam Feeney
  Alex Kuznetsov
  Tim Smyczek
  Fritz Wolmarans

Champions

Singles

 Ryler DeHeart def.  Carsten Ball, 6–2, 3–6, 7–5

Doubles

 Carsten Ball /  Travis Rettenmaier def.  Adam Feeney /  Nathan Healey, 6–3, 6–4

References
Official website
ITF search 

Sunset Moulding YCRC Challenger